Kołodziejczak or Kolodziejczak is an occupational surname derived from the occupation kołodziej, or wheelwright. Notable people with this surname include:
 Timothée Kolodziejczak (born 1991), French footballer
 Tomasz Kołodziejczak (born 1967), Polish writer

See also
 
 Kołodziejczyk
 Kołodziej

Polish-language surnames
Occupational surnames